Mirsad Bektašević (born 30 July 1987), alias Maximus, is a Swedish citizen born in Montenegro, Yugoslavia who in 2005 was arrested in Sarajevo, Bosnia and Herzegovina, charged with planning a terrorist attack against an unnamed target. Bektašević was convicted in 2007 alongside three other men and sentenced to 15 years and 4 months of imprisonment.

Early life
His father was killed in a traffic accident while Mirsad Bektašević was a young boy. 
In 1994, Bektašević moved to Sweden together with his mother, and younger brother. He grew up in Kungälv north of Gothenburg. Bektašević frequently attended the Bellevue Mosque in central Gothenburg.

Criminal Charges
On 19 October 2005 Bektašević was arrested as police raided his aunt's apartment in Butmir, Sarajevo. Abdulkadir Cesur, a 20-year-old Turkish citizen, born and raised in Denmark, was also arrested at the time. In the raid, police found a home-made suicide belt,  of factory-made explosives, timing devices, detonators and a Hi-8 videotape with footage demonstrating how to make a home-made bomb. Also retrieved in the raid was a video of Bektašević and Cesur in ski masks, surrounded by explosives and weapons, which was to be published following the attacks. In the video they say that they will attack sites in Europe to punish nations with forces in Afghanistan and Iraq. They were suspected of planning a suicide attack against a Western embassy in Sarajevo. The two had been under surveillance after arriving in Sarajevo on September 27.

The arrests triggered police raids in London and Denmark, where nine others, including Younes Tsouli (alias Irhabi 007), a 22-year-old Moroccan living in London who became an infamous cyber terrorist and key conduit for Al-Qaeda in Iraq, were arrested. The arrest of Tsouli was possible due to information found on Bektašević's computer and mobile phone.

After his arrest in Sarajevo, Bektašević was also interrogated by the British intelligence service MI5, who named him as the organizer of a suspected plot by Islamic terrorists to carry out multiple suicide bombings of the White House and the Capitol in Washington DC.

Bektašević allegedly was an Internet recruiter, under the alias Maximus, for young Muslims to join the insurgency in Iraq. According to the British newspaper The Times, citing police and intelligence sources, Bektašević had visited the former leader of Al-Qaeda in Iraq, Abu Musab al-Zarqawi, and run one of his web sites. Bektašević also went by the alias Abu Imad As-Sanjaki on various internet forums.

The trial against Bektašević and three other men, the Danish Turk Cesur Abdulkadir and two Bosnian nationals named Bajro Ikanović and Senad Hasanović, started on 26 June 2006, in Sarajevo.

On 10 January 2007 Bektašević was sentenced to fifteen years and four months in prison. Apart from terrorism crimes, Bektašević was convicted of illicit arms possession and violent resistance. Out of the other charged in the trial, Cesur Abdulkadir received thirteen years, while Bajro Ikanović was sentenced to eight years and Senad Hasanović to two years and six months in prison. In June 2007 an appeals court reduced Bektašević sentence to eight years and four months.

In March 2009 the Swedish government granted a request by Bektašević to serve the remainder of his prison sentence in Sweden. He was transferred to a Swedish prison in June 2009. Since the custom in Swedish justice system is to be released from prison after serving two thirds of the sentence, Bektašević was released on May 10, 2011.

Since his release Bektašević has been convicted for firearms violations in 2013 after having been caught with a loaded pistol. In 2014 Swedish media noted that Bektašević traveled to Syria to fight with ISIS. Bektašević denied the allegations via his Twitter account, saying he is critical about ISIS instead and he would definitely not want to join them. In late January 2016 Bektašević and Al Hasani Amer (also a Swedish citizen, but of Jemeni extraction) were arrested at a bus depot in Alexandroupolis in Greece after trying to board a bus bound for the Greek-Turkish borders with knives and uniforms in their luggage. Bektašević said that according to the store owner it would be legal to own such knives in Greece. Al-Hassani was also denied medical treatment, according to Bektašević. On 11 May 2017 a Greek court sentenced  both al-Hassani and Bektašević to 15 years in prison for being members of a yet to name terrorist organisation and possession of weapons.

References 

1987 births
Living people
Bosnia and Herzegovina emigrants to Sweden
Swedish Islamists
Islamic terrorism in Sweden
People imprisoned on charges of terrorism
Swedish people imprisoned abroad
Prisoners and detainees of Bosnia and Herzegovina
Muslims with branch missing
Al-Qaeda activities in Europe